The Portsmouth South by-election was held on 14 June 1984, following the death of Bonner Pink, the Conservative MP for Portsmouth South.

Portsmouth South was considered a safe seat for the Conservatives.  Pink had held the constituency since the 1966 general election, while the party had held the seat since its creation in 1918.  At the 1983 general election, Pink had taken just over half the votes cast.

Candidates
The Conservatives stood Patrick Rock.

The Social Democratic Party (SDP) had narrowly taken second place in the constituency in 1983, with just over one quarter of the vote.  They stood Mike Hancock, an engineer and member of Hampshire County Council, who had been their unsuccessful candidate in 1983.

The Labour Party had been pushed into third place in 1983, taking 22% of the vote.  They also re-stood their candidate from the previous year, Sally Thomas, a supporter of unilateral nuclear disarmament.  As Portsmouth South was the headquarters of the Royal Navy, this was a significant issue in the campaign.

Three other candidates had stood in the general election, and two of these stood in the by-election: Gordon Knight of the far right National Front, and Alan Evens who stood as "Liberal for Unilateral Nuclear Disarmament", while four new candidate completed the field.  Terry Mitchell stood for the Ecology Party, Thomas Layton stood as "Spare the Earth - Ecology", Anthony Andrews stood as an independent with the slogan "Vote Education: Save Schools & Colleges", and Pete Smith stood for the New National Party.

Result
The SDP unexpectedly gained the seat.  The Conservative vote fell sharply, while Labour saw only a small increase.  None of the other candidates were able to take 1% of the votes cast.

Hancock lost the seat at the 1987 general election, but was able to retake it in 1997.

References

Portsmouth South by-election
Portsmouth South by-election
By-elections to the Parliament of the United Kingdom in Hampshire constituencies
Elections in Portsmouth
Portsmouth South by-election
1980s in Hampshire